Leo Kalmet (2 March 1900, Orajõe parish, Pärnu – 16 September 1975, Tallinn) was an Estonian stage actor and theatre director.

Kalmet graduated in 1920 from the Tallinn Humanitarian Gymnasium for Boys, and then in 1924 from the Drama Studio theater school. In addition, he studied from 1920-25 at Tartu University's Faculty of Law, Department of Commerce, as at the singing at the Tallinn Conservatory.

He participated in the Estonian War of Independence and taught at the Tallinn Conservatory.

A monument to Kalmet can be found at Gonsiori in downtown Tallinn.

References

External links
 Biograafia ESBL-is

1900 births
1975 deaths
Estonian theatre directors
Estonian male stage actors
20th-century Estonian male actors
University of Tartu alumni
Estonian Academy of Music and Theatre alumni
Academic staff of the Estonian Academy of Music and Theatre
Estonian military personnel of the Estonian War of Independence
People from Häädemeeste Parish